Injury prevention is an effort to prevent or reduce the severity of bodily injuries caused by external mechanisms, such as accidents, before they occur.  Injury prevention is a component of safety and public health, and its goal is to improve the health of the population by preventing injuries and hence improving quality of life. Among laypersons, the term "accidental injury" is often used.  However, "accidental" implies the causes of injuries are random in nature.  Researchers prefer the term "unintentional injury" to refer to injuries that are nonvolitional but often preventable. Data from the U.S. Centers for Disease Control show that unintentional injuries are a significant public health concern: they are by far the leading cause of death from ages 1 through 44.  During these years, unintentional injuries account for more deaths than the next three leading causes of death combined. Unintentional injuries also account for the top ten sources of nonfatal emergency room visits for persons up to age 9 and nine of the top ten sources of nonfatal emergency room visits for persons over the age of 9.

Injury prevention strategies cover a variety of approaches, many of which are classified as falling under the "3 Es" of injury prevention: education, engineering modifications, and enforcement/enactment of policies.  Some organizations and researchers have variously proposed the addition of equity, empowerment, emotion, empathy, evaluation, and economic incentives to this list.

Measuring effectiveness 
Injury prevention research can be challenging because the usual outcome of interest is deaths or injuries prevented and it is difficult to measure how many people did not get hurt who otherwise would have. Education efforts can be measured by changes in knowledge, attitudes, and beliefs and behaviors before and after an intervention; however, tying these changes back into reductions in morbidity and mortality is often problematic. Effectiveness of injury prevention interventions is typically evaluated by examining trends in morbidity and mortality in a population may provide some indication of the effectiveness of injury prevention interventions. Online databases, such as the Web-based Injury Statistics Query and Reporting System (WISQARS) allow both researchers and members of the public to measure shifts in mortality over time.

Common types

Traffic and automobile safety 
Traffic safety and automobile safety are a major component of injury prevention because it is the leading cause of death for children and young adults into their mid 30s.  Injury prevention efforts began in the early 1960s when activist Ralph Nader exposed automobiles as being more dangerous than necessary in his book Unsafe at Any Speed. This led to engineering changes in the way cars are designed to allow for more crush space between the vehicle and the occupant. The Centers for Disease Control and Prevention (CDC) also contributes significantly to automobile safety. CDC Injury Prevention Champion David Sleet illustrated the importance of lowering the legal blood alcohol content limit to 0.08 percent for drivers, requiring disposable lighters to be child resistant; and using evidence to demonstrate the dangers of airbags to young children riding in the front seat of vehicles.

Engineering: vehicle crash worthiness, seat belts, airbags, locking seat belts for child seats.

Education: promote seat belt use, discourage impaired driving, promote child safety seats.

Enforcement and enactment: passage and enforcement of primary seat belt laws, speed limits, impaired driving enforcement.

Pedestrian safety 
Pedestrian safety is the focus of both epidemiological and psychological injury prevention research. Epidemiological studies typically focus on causes external to the individual such as traffic density, access to safe walking areas, socioeconomic status, injury rates, legislation for safety (e.g., traffic fines), or even the shape of vehicles, which can affect the severity of injuries resulting from a collision. Epidemiological data show children aged 1–4 are at greatest risk for injury in driveway and sidewalks. Children aged 5–14 are at greatest risk while attempting to cross streets.

Psychological pedestrian safety studies extend as far back as the mid-1980s, when researchers began examining behavioral variables in children.  Behavioral variables of interest include selection of crossing gaps in traffic, attention to traffic, the number of near hits or actual hits, or the routes children chose when crossing multiple streets such as while walking to school. The most common technique used in behavioral pedestrian research is the pretend road, in which a child stands some distance from the curb and watches traffic on the real road, then walks to the edge of the street when a crossing opportunity is chosen. Research is gradually shifting to more ecologically valid virtual reality techniques.

Home safety 

Home accidents including burns, drownings, and poisonings are the most common cause of death in industrialized countries. Efforts to prevent accidents such as providing safety equipment and teaching about home safety practices may reduce the rate of injuries.

Occupational safety and health 
A musculoskeletal injury (MSI) is the most common health hazard in workplaces. Injuries can be prevented by using proper body mechanics.

Other 
The following is an abbreviated list of other common focal areas of injury prevention efforts:
 Bicycle safety
 Boat and water safety
 Consumer product safety
Farm Safety
 Firearm safety
 Fire and burn safety
 Impaired driving
 Poison control
 Toy safety
 Traffic safety
 Sports injury safety

See also 
 CDC Injury Center
U.S. Consumer Product Safety Commission
 Haddon Matrix
 Home Safety Council
 National Highway Traffic Safety Administration
 National Institute for Occupational Safety and Health

References

Further reading 

Research journals covering injury prevention include:
 Accident Analysis and Prevention
 Journal of Injury and Violence Research
 Injury Prevention
 International Journal of Injury Control and Safety Promotion
 Journal of Safety Research
 Journal of Trauma
 Safety Science
 Traffic Injury Prevention
 Transportation Research: Traffic Psychology and Behavior

External links 
 WHO violence and injury prevention
 Handicap International 
 Safe Kids Worldwide
 After the Injury - Children's Hospital Of Philadelphia
 Healthy Canadians
 Canada's Consumer Product Safety Program
 National Safety Council

Public health
Biostatistics
Safety
Working conditions